The discography of American country music artist Sylvia contains 11 studio albums, four compilation albums, six music videos, 22 singles and one album appearance. She was signed to RCA Records and collaborated with producer Tom Collins, who established her as a country pop recording artist. Her first charting single was 1979's "You Don't Miss a Thing," which reached the top 40 of the Billboard Hot Country Songs chart. She had her first major hit in 1980 with "Tumbleweed." In 1981, Sylvia her first number one hit on the country songs chart with "Drifter." Her debut studio album was also released in 1981 and peaked at number 10 on the Billboard Top Country Albums chart. In 1982, Sylvia had her biggest hit with the single "Nobody." Not only did it top the country songs chart, but it also crossed over to number 15 on the Billboard Hot 100. It was followed by "Like Nothing Ever Happened," which reached number two on the country singles list. Both songs were included on her second album, Just Sylvia. It sold over 500,000 copies in the United States, leading to its gold certification from the Recording Industry Association of America. 

In 1983, Sylvia followed with Snapshot, which reached number seven on the country albums survey. It produced three top ten hits, including the number three "I Never Quite Got Back (From Loving You)." In 1984, Surprise, only reached number 40 on the country albums list. Her country pop sound caused Sylvia to become increasingly frustrated. She soon joined with Brent Maher who produced her next two releases for RCA. The first was One Step Closer (1985), which spawned three major hits: "Fallin' in Love," "Cry Just a Little Bit" and "I Love You by Heart." The follow-up album with Maher (Knockin' Around) was never released and Sylvia left RCA Records in 1987. She re-surfaced in 1992 as a touring artist. Her next album release was 1996's The Real Story. She continued releasing new music and issued 2002's Where in the World next. Her most recent studio effort is a collection of re-recordings entitled Second Bloom: The Hits Re-Imagined.

Albums

Studio albums

Compilation albums

Singles

As lead artist

As a featured artist

Music videos

Other album appearances

References

External links
 Sylvia full discography at her official website

Discographies of American artists
Country music discographies